David Harold Rowbotham  (27 August 1924 – 6 October 2010) was an Australian poet and journalist.

Early life
Rowbotham was born in the Darling Downs of Queensland, in the city of Toowoomba. He attended Toowoomba Grammar School and studied at the University of Queensland and the University of Sydney. He served in the Second World War on the Pacific front.

Literary career

Rowbotham worked as a journalist for the Toowoomba Chronicle and Brisbane Courier-Mail (1955–64). He lectured in English at the University of Queensland (1965–1969), and became the literary critic of the Brisbane Courier-Mail (1969–1980), and its literary editor (1980–1987).

Though lyrical in form, Rowbotham's poems are often concerned with history. After the publication of his Selected Poems by Penguin in 1994, covering a period of fifty years, Rowbotham entered a startling late period of productivity which culminated in the publication of the much-lauded Poems for America in 2002. In 2005 the Wagtail series from Picaro Press published a chapbook of Rowbotham's called The Brown Island.

Later life

A friend and mentor to many other Australian writers, Rowbotham also maintained extensive international connections, travelling frequently to the United States.

He died on 6 October 2010.

Awards and recognition

Rowbotham was made a Member of the Order of Australia (AM) in 1991 in recognition of his service to literature.

In 2007 Rowbotham received the Patrick White Award; the presentation was made 9 November 2007, in Brisbane.

Bibliography
 Ploughman and Poet (1954)
 Inland (1958)
 All the Room (1964)
 Bungalow and Hurricane (1967)
 The Makers of the Ark (1970)
 The Pen of Feathers (1971)
 Maydays (1980)
 Selected Poems (1994)
 The Ebony Gates (1996)
 Poems for America (2002)
 The Brown Island (2005)
  The Cave in the Sky (2005)
 The Star of Engelmeer (2006)
 Rogue Moons (2007)

References

External links
 David Rowbotham: A Chronicle
 Reviews of Poems for America
 

1924 births
2010 deaths
Australian journalists
People from Toowoomba
Writers from Queensland
Patrick White Award winners
20th-century Australian poets
Australian male poets
People educated at Toowoomba Grammar School
20th-century Australian male writers
Members of the Order of Australia